KOTN (102.5 FM) is a radio station broadcasting a classic country format, simulcasting KWAK-FM 105.5 Stuttgart, AR. Licensed to Gould, Arkansas, United States, it serves the area. The station is currently owned by Arkansas County Broadcasters, Inc.

On April 1, 2010, KOTN changed their format from country to oldies, simulcasting KWAK-FM 105.5.

On April 23, 2012, KOTN changed their format from oldies back to classic country, simulcasting KWAK-FM 105.5.

References

External links

OTN